Cycle street may refer to:

 Bicycle boulevard, a road designed mainly for cycle traffic
 CycleStreets, an online Journey planner, based in the United Kingdom